The Geordie Scene was a British television music series produced by Tyne Tees from 1974–76. The programme showcased artists from the North East of England as well as nationally known groups.

In 2020, performances by a number of pub rock acts who featured on the show (including Dr Feelgood and Ace) was shown as part of Sky Arts' series, Guy Garvey: From The Vaults, produced by Wise Owl Films (part of Lime Pictures).

References

External links
The Geordie Scene on Nostalgia Central

Television shows produced by Tyne Tees Television